Lumpenus is a genus of marine ray-finned fishes belonging to the family Stichaeidae.

The genus was first proposed by Reinhardt in 1836.

Species
The following species are classified within this genus:

References

Lumpeninae